Junonia is a genus of nymphalid butterflies, described by Jacob Hübner in 1819. They are commonly known as buckeyes, pansies or commodores. This genus flies on every continent except Antarctica. The genus contains roughly 30 to 35 species.

Description

These butterflies are medium to large (wingspan 40–110 mm). The ground colour is brown or grey suffused blue. Spots on the wings are orange, blue or pink and sometimes large. Many of the species can occur in several colour forms. The head is of moderate size with smooth, prominent eyes. The palpi are rather long, sharply pointed, ascending, generally convergent and scaly, sometimes more or less hairy. The antennae are of moderate length, generally with a rather short, abruptly formed club. The thorax is robust, ovate, rather sparingly clothed with hairs. The wing characters are: large, broad, variable in outline. Forewing: costa more or less arched, sometimes very strongly so; apical portion more or less produced, sometimes very prominent, with a strong projection on the hind margin at the extremity of the first discoidal nervule; hind margin always more or less dentate and emarginate, with, in many species, a considerable projection at extremity of third median nervule; inner margin nearly straight, or slightly emarginate about centre; discoidal cell generally closed by a slender nervule. Hindwing: costa strongly arched at base, and more or less so throughout; hind margin always more or less scalloped, sometimes simply rounded (without any marked projections), sometimes with a more or less elongate production of anal angle, and occasionally with a longer or shorter projection of hind margin at extremity of first median nervule; inner margins deeply grooved and entirely covering the under surface of the abdomen; discoidal cell generally open. The abdomen short, compressed, rather slender.

The larvae are rather stout, almost of equal thickness throughout, armed with strong branched spines; sometimes with two short, similar spines on head. The pupae are moderately angulated, with raised tubercles on the back, head slightly bifid. Sometimes hardly angulated, the anterior portions more rounded.

Biology

Junonia are good fliers. The larvae feed on a wide variety of plants, among others Labiatae, Acanthaceae, Amaranthaceae, Scrophulariaceae, Onagraceae, Leguminosae, Balsaminaceae, Gramineae, Melastomataceae, Plantaginaceae, Aucubaceae and Compositae. The species found in South India generally show very sensitive behaviour.

Taxonomy
The leaf butterflies J. ansorgei and J. cymodoce (both from Africa) have traditionally been included in Kallima, but this genus is now usually limited to Asian species. Instead of being placed in Junonia, the two are sometimes awarded their own genus, Kamilla. The leaf butterfly J. tugela is sometimes included in Precis instead of Junonia.

Recent phylogenetic and DNA research resulted some subspecies being elevated to species rank, along with some new species descriptions. Currently, the species Junonia divaricata, Junonia evarete, Junonia genoveva, and Junonia litoralis are restricted to South America. Six species are present in the United States: Junonia coenia, Junonia grisea, Junonia neildi, Junonia nigrosuffusa, Junonia stemosa, and Junonia zonalis.

The species in Junonia:

References

External links 
Seitz, A. Die Gross-Schmetterlinge der Erde 13: Die Afrikanischen Tagfalter. Plate XIII 52 et prae.

 
Junoniini
Butterfly genera
Taxa named by Jacob Hübner